Quinkan rock art refers to a large body of locally, nationally and internationally significant Aboriginal rock art in Australia of a style characterised by their unique representations of "Quinkans" (an Aboriginal mythological being, often spelt "Quinkin"), found among the sandstone escarpments around the small town of Laura, Queensland (aka Quinkan region or Quinkan country). Quinkan Country was inscribed on the Australian National Heritage List on 10 November 2018.

Location 

The Australian Heritage Commission's 1980 entry on the register of the national estate describes the Quinkan rock art as being located across 230,000 hectares of rugged sandstone plateaux and escarpments 4 km south east of Laura and 50 km west of Cooktown.

Selected sites are open for visits by the public, through guided tours with local Aboriginal guides organised by the Quinkan Regional Cultural Centre. Split Rock, approximately 15 km south of Laura, is currently open to self-guided visitors for a small fee.  The Quinkan Reserves, owned by Aboriginal Trustees, are closed to public access.

Significance 

The Australian Heritage Commission's 1980 national estate entry describes the Quinkan rock art as constituting "..some of the largest bodies of prehistoric art in the world. The paintings are generally large and well preserved, and engravings of great antiquity occur. The Quinkan art is outstanding both in variety, quantity and quality."

The two brothers, George Musgrave and Tommy George dedicated their lives to protecting the rock art and teaching a number of younger Aboriginal Traditional Owners about the history and stories relating to their connection to the land and rock art of the Quinkan region.

Description

Rock art types include painting, stencil and engravings. Painting is generally in a figurative style, with people, animals and their tracks and mythical beings are depicted, usually in one or two colours. Red ochre dominates although white, yellow, black and a rare blue pigment also exist. Engravings of both figurative and abstract styles are found throughout Quinkan country.

Cultural heritage of the Quinkan region also includes story places, campsites and other evidence of Aboriginal people's long occupation history. In the 1870s the Palmer River Gold Rush brought a large influx of European and Chinese miners into Quinkan country, with thousands of miners traversing through here between the goldfields and the port of Cooktown. Despite the violent clashes that took place between miners and Aboriginal people, and the subsequent attempts at control of Aboriginal people by government policy, a highly significant connection to country and culture by Aboriginal people remains.

Gallery

References

Bibliography

 Australian Heritage Commission (1980) Quinkan Country, Peninsula Development Road, Laura, Queensland, Australia. Initial Entry on the Australian Heritage Commissions Register of the National Estate, now entry upon the Australian Heritage database accessed 20 January 2013
 Australian Parliament House of Representatives Standing Committee on Environment and Conservation (1979) Preservation of the Quinkan Galleries, Cape York Peninsula : report from the House of Representatives Standing Committee on Environment and Conservation, March 1979. Canberra : Australian Government Publishing Service
 Cole, N. (1995). "Rock Art in the Laura-Cooktown Region, S.E. Cape York Peninsula", Tempus Vol. 3. St. Lucia, Qld: Anthropology Museum, University of Queensland
 Cole, N. (2003) "Laura rock art, Cape York Peninsula: A model of regional style" Adoranten 5-22.
 Cole,N & Buhrich, A (2012) "Endangered Rock Art: Forty Years of Cultural Heritage Management in the Quinkan region, Cape York Peninsula" Australian Archaeology Number 75
 George, T. & Musgrave, G. (1995) Our country, our art, our Quinkans. Laura: Ang-gnarra Aboriginal Corporation
 George, T & Musgrave, G "The Quinkan Reserves" Text to Short James Cook University on-line introduction to the Quinkan reserves Accessed 22 January 2013
 Morwood, M & Hobbs, D (eds) (1995) Quinkan Prehistory: The Archaeology of Aboriginal Art in S.E. Cape York Peninsula, Australia Tempus Volume 3. Anthropology Museum, University of Queensland, St. Lucia, Brisbane.
 Nulty,D & Conway,J (2010) "Tour Guide Manual for the Laura Rangers" Guidebook produced for the Laura rangers, South Cape York Catchments, and Queensland Department of Environment and Resource Management Accessed 20 January 2013
 Rosenfeld, A, D Horton & J Winter (1981) Early Man in North Queensland: Art and Archaeology in the Laura Area. Canberra: Terra Australia 6, Department of Prehistory, Research School of Pacific Studies.
 Rosenfeld, A (1982) "Style and Meaning in Laura Art: A Case Study in the Formal Analysis of Style in Prehistoric Art" Mankind vol 13, pages 199-217
 Sutton,P (2011) "Cape York Peninsula Indigenous Cultural Story:Preliminary Outline". Paper produced for the Queensland Department of Environment and Resource Management Accessed 20 January 2013
 Trezise, P.J (1969) Quinkan Country: Adventures in Search of Aboriginal Cave Paintings in Cape York. A.H. & A.W. Reed, Sydney.
 Trezise P.J (1971) Rock Art of South-East Cape York. Australian Institute of Aboriginal and Torres Strait Islander Studies, Canberra.

External links
 Short Introduction to the Quinkan Reserves with text by Thaipan Aboriginal elders
 Copy of 1979 Appeal to 'Save Quinkan Rockart', including description of the Quinkan as Aboriginal spiritual beings, plus Quinkan National Park proposal
 Quinkan and Regional Cultural Centre website
 "Quinkan Country - Queensland's Aboriginal Rock Art Capital", Cooktown Chamber of Commerce & Shire Council webpage

Rock art in Australia
Far North Queensland
Archaeological sites in Queensland
Australian Aboriginal mythology
Cultural landscapes of North-East Queensland
Australian National Heritage List